Argimiro Pérez García (born 14 March 1959), commonly known as Pichi Lucas, is a Spanish former footballer who played as a striker, currently a manager.

He spent most of his career with Celta, for which he appeared in 288 official games and scored 92 goals. His La Liga input consisted of 113 matches and 18 goals over six seasons, also representing in the competition Compostela.

Lucas subsequently worked as a coach.

Playing career
Born in Camponaraya, Castile and León, Lucas' professional career was solely associated to two Galician clubs, RC Celta de Vigo and SD Compostela. After a loan to lowly Córdoba CF, he returned to the former for the 1981–82 season, scoring a career-best 26 goals in 37 games en route to a La Liga promotion.

Lucas made his debut in the Spanish top flight on 5 September 1982, playing the full 90 minutes in a 0–1 away loss against Sevilla FC. He netted his first goal in the competition twenty days later in a 2–2 home draw with RCD Español, but only added another until the end of the campaign and his team was eventually relegated; during his tenure with Celta, he experienced a further two promotions and relegations.

In the summer of 1991, after one year in Segunda División B with neighbouring CD Ourense, Lucas signed for Compostela from Segunda División. He contributed nine goals in 28 matches in his third season, as the club reached the top tier for the first time in its history.

Lucas retired at the end of the 1994–95 campaign at the age of 36, after helping Compos retain their newfound status by scoring four times in only 14 appearances.

Coaching career
From 1998 to 2000, Lucas acted as interim manager at Compostela, being in charge for a total of eight second-division games and winning only two. He subsequently worked mainly in lower league football, helping SD Ponferradina reach division two in 2006, a first-ever for the club.

Lucas was fired on 30 April 2007 after a 3–3 home draw against UD Vecindario (seven rounds remaining), as the side went on to suffer relegation. In the following years he worked in the third tier, with FC Cartagena, Real Oviedo, Celta de Vigo B and FC Jumilla.

Managerial statistics

Honours

Club
Celta
Segunda División: 1981–82
Segunda División B: 1980–81

Individual
Pichichi Trophy (Segunda División): 1981–82

References

External links

1959 births
Living people
Spanish footballers
Footballers from Castile and León
Association football forwards
La Liga players
Segunda División players
Segunda División B players
RC Celta de Vigo players
Córdoba CF players
CD Ourense footballers
SD Compostela footballers
Spanish football managers
Segunda División managers
Segunda División B managers
SD Compostela managers
SD Ponferradina managers
FC Cartagena managers
Real Oviedo managers
FC Jumilla managers
Celta de Vigo B managers